The IRIS WorkSpace was a graphically organized iconic desktop environment that allowed access to the IRIX file system along with simplified system administration via the system manager. The IRIS WorkSpace was used by Silicon Graphics from 4D1-3.0 - IRIX 5.0. It was succeeded in 1993 by the Indigo Magic Desktop introduced with IRIX 5.1 and the Indy workstation.

References
Jim Barton: Silicon Graphics Computer Systems USENET comp.sys.sgi, 4D1-3.2 1989 Release Notes (Part 1 of 3)

Desktop environments
Silicon Graphics